The Oklahoma State University College of Education (COE) serves more than 3000 students within 29 graduate and undergraduate programs at Oklahoma State University in Stillwater, Oklahoma as well as Tulsa, Oklahoma. The College of Education comprises three schools with diversity of students.

Schools of the College of Education

School of Applied Health and Educational Psychology
The School of Applied Health and Educational Psychology (SAHEP) cultivates the development, integration and application of knowledge, theory, skills and experiences to promote social, physical, psychological, educational, and environmental health. SAHEP is composed of eight program areas:
Athletic Training
Counseling Psychology
Counseling (Community & School)
Educational Psychology
Health Promotion
Leisure Studies (LSM & TR)
Physical Education
School Psychology

School of Teaching and Curriculum Leadership

STCL Undergraduate Programs

Elementary Education
K-12 Education (art, foreign language)
Occupational Education Studies
Reading Education
Secondary Education
Special Education

STCL Masters of Science Programs

Curriculum Studies
Elementary, Middle, Secondary, & K12 Education
Occupational Education Studies
Reading/Literacy
Library Media Specialist
Special Education

STCL Doctor of Philosophy (Ph.D.) in Education 

Curriculum Studies
Occupational Education Studies
Professional Education Studies
Social Foundations of Education

School of Educational Foundations, Leadership and Aviation 
The School of Educational Foundations, Leadership and Aviation offers Advanced Degree in Aviation, Educational Leadership, Research Evaluation and Social Foundations. The Aviation program also offers bachelor's degrees in Professional Pilot and Aviation Management.
Aviation and Space Education
Educational Leader
Research, Evaluation, Measurements & Statistics
Social Foundations
Educational Technology

External links
Official website

Liberal arts colleges at universities in the United States